The 2013 Mid-American Conference baseball tournament was held from May 22 through 25.  The top eight regular season finishers of the league's twelve teams, regardless of division, met in the double-elimination tournament held at All Pro Freight Stadium in Avon, Ohio.  Sixth seed  won their third tournament championship to earn the conference's automatic bid to the 2013 NCAA Division I baseball tournament.

Seeding and format
The top eight finishers based on conference winning percentage, regardless of division, were seeded one through eight.  Teams then played a two bracket, double-elimination tournament leading to a single elimination final.

Results

All-Tournament Team
The following players were named to the All-Tournament Team.

Most Valuable Player
Nick Bruns was named Tournament Most Valuable Player.  Bruns was a pitcher for Bowling Green, who recorded two wins and a save in the tournament.

References

Mid-American Conference Baseball Tournament
Mid-American Conference baseball tournament
Tournament
Mid-American Conference baseball tournament
Baseball competitions in Ohio
College sports tournaments in Ohio